The 1968–69 season was the 60th year of football played by Dundee United, and covers the period from 1 July 1968 to 30 June 1969. United finished in fifth place in the First Division.

Match results
Dundee United played a total of 43 competitive matches during the 1968–69 season.

Legend

All results are written with Dundee United's score first.
Own goals in italics

First Division

Scottish Cup

League Cup

References

See also
 1968–69 in Scottish football

Dundee United F.C. seasons
Dundee United